Nyceryx stuarti is a species of moth in the family Sphingidae.

Distribution 
It is found from Costa Rica and Peru to Brazil, Bolivia and Paraguay.

Description 
The wingspan is about 66 mm. It is similar to Nyceryx riscus, but larger and darker and the forewing apex is distinctly truncate.

Biology 
Adults are probably on wing year round.

The larvae probably feed on Pentagonia donnell-smithii and Chimarrhis parviflora.

References

Nyceryx
Moths described in 1894